The following is the final results of the 1993 World Wrestling Championships. Men's freestyle competition were held in Toronto, Ontario, Canada. Men's Greco-Roman competition were held in Stockholm, Sweden and Women's competition were held in Stavern, Norway.

Medal table

Team ranking

Medal summary

Men's freestyle

Men's Greco-Roman

Women's freestyle

References
UWW Database

World Wrestling Championships
W
W
W
W
W
1993 in Toronto
1983 in Canadian sports
International wrestling competitions hosted by Sweden
International sports competitions in Toronto